Nahoo is the first album by Scottish musician Paul Mounsey.

Track listing
 "Passing Away" (5:16)
 "Alba" (5:15)
 "Robert Campbell's Lament" (3:06)
 "Journeyman" (3:48)
 "Dalmore" (3:58)
 "Stranger In A Strange Land" (6:19)
 "As Terras Baixas Da Holanda" (3:44)
 "From Ebb To Flood" (6:02)
 "I Will Go" (4:37)
 "My Faithful Fond One" (4:49)
 "Illusion" (4:54)

1994 albums
Paul Mounsey albums